Zoltán Kész (born 22 January 1974 in Veszprém, Hungary) is a Hungarian civil activist and English language teacher. He is a former member of Fidesz.

In February 2015, a by-election was held in the city of Veszprém, and Kész was elected, thus Viktor Orbán's national conservative Fidesz lost its supermajority in the National Assembly.

References

Hungarian activists
Living people
1974 births
People from Veszprém
Members of the National Assembly of Hungary (2014–2018)